Sooraj Thelakkad is an Indian actor, comedian, impressionist and television presenter, who appears in Malayalam films and television. He came into limelight after doing the role of robot as a title character in the film Android Kunjappan Version 5.25 directed by Ratheesh Poduval. Sooraj started his career as an impressionist and comedian and has appeared in several television shows.

Early life 
Sooraj is the youngest child of the two children of Alikkal Mohanan, a collection agent in vanitha co-operative bank and Jyothilakshmi, a housewife. He had his primary education from Government L.P. School, Thelakkad. Sooraj completed his Graduation in B.Com St.Mary's College Puthananghadi . He started performing mimicry for the first time when he was in the 5th grade. His breakthrough came when he acted in Cinema Chirima, a comedy program which was broadcast on Mazhavil Manorama  with Kalabhavan Mani and Comedy Super Nite with Suraj venjaramoodu.

Career 
Sooraj started his career as a stand-up comedian. His mimicry shows were a success with the audience. He first acted in a film named Charlie which was directed by Martin Prakat.

Filmography

Television

References

External links
 
 

Malayalam comedians
Living people
Male actors from Kerala
1995 births
Bigg Boss Malayalam contestants